TVP3 Białystok is one of the regional branches of the TVP, Poland's public television broadcaster. It serves the entire Podlaskie Voivodeship.

External links 

 

Television channels and stations established in 1997
Mass media in Białystok
Telewizja Polska